Under Hungarian mixed member proportional system of election, the National Assembly has 106 constituencies (electoral districts), each of which elects one member of the National Assembly by first-past-the-post voting (a plurality of votes). At least 106 more representatives are elected from closed lists in each of Hungarian Counties, distributed in a manner that ensures that the overall proportion of representatives for each party is approximately equal to the proportion of votes its list received.

Voting was last held in Hungarian constituencies on 3 April 2022, determining the members of the National Assembly of Hungary (2022–2026).

List of seats by County

Budapest
18 constituencies:

 1st constituency of Budapest
 2nd constituency of Budapest
 3rd constituency of Budapest
 4th constituency of Budapest
 5th constituency of Budapest
 6th constituency of Budapest
 7th constituency of Budapest
 8th constituency of Budapest
 9th constituency of Budapest
 10th constituency of Budapest
 11th constituency of Budapest
 12th constituency of Budapest
 13th constituency of Budapest
 14th constituency of Budapest
 15th constituency of Budapest
 16th constituency of Budapest
 17th constituency of Budapest
 18th constituency of Budapest

Bács-Kiskun
6 constituencies:

 1st constituency of Bács-Kiskun County
 2nd constituency of Bács-Kiskun County
 3rd constituency of Bács-Kiskun County
 4th constituency of Bács-Kiskun County
 5th constituency of Bács-Kiskun County
 6th constituency of Bács-Kiskun County

Baranya
4 constituencies:

 1st constituency of Baranya County
 2nd constituency of Baranya County
 3rd constituency of Baranya County
 4th constituency of Baranya County

Békés
4 constituencsies:

 1st constituency of Békés County
 2nd constituency of Békés County
 3rd constituency of Békés County
 4th constituency of Békés County

Borsod-Abaúj-Zemplén
7 constituencies:

 1st constituency of Borsod-Abaúj-Zemplén County
 2nd constituency of Borsod-Abaúj-Zemplén County
 3rd constituency of Borsod-Abaúj-Zemplén County
 4th constituency of Borsod-Abaúj-Zemplén County
 5th constituency of Borsod-Abaúj-Zemplén County
 6th constituency of Borsod-Abaúj-Zemplén County
 7th constituency of Borsod-Abaúj-Zemplén County

Csongrád-Csanád
4 constituencies:

 1st constituency of Csongrád-Csanád County
 2nd constituency of Csongrád-Csanád County
 3rd constituency of Csongrád-Csanád County
 4th constituency of Csongrád-Csanád County

Fejér
5 constituencies:

 1st constituency of Fejér County
 2nd constituency of Fejér County
 3rd constituency of Fejér County
 4th constituency of Fejér County
 5th constituency of Fejér County

Győr-Moson-Sopron
5 constituencies:

 1st constituency of Győr-Moson-Sopron County
 2nd constituency of Győr-Moson-Sopron County
 3rd constituency of Győr-Moson-Sopron County
 4th constituency of Győr-Moson-Sopron County
 5th constituency of Győr-Moson-Sopron County

Hajdú-Bihar
6 constituencies:

 1st constituency of Hajdú-Bihar County
 2nd constituency of Hajdú-Bihar County
 3rd constituency of Hajdú-Bihar County
 4th constituency of Hajdú-Bihar County
 5th constituency of Hajdú-Bihar County
 6th constituency of Hajdú-Bihar County

Heves
3 constituencies:

 1st constituency of Heves County
 2nd constituency of Heves County
 3rd constituency of Heves County

Jász-Nagykun-Szolnok
4 constituencies:

 1st constituency of Jász-Nagykun-Szolnok County
 2nd constituency of Jász-Nagykun-Szolnok County
 3rd constituency of Jász-Nagykun-Szolnok County
 4th constituency of Jász-Nagykun-Szolnok County

Komárom-Esztergom
3 constituencies:

 1st constituency of Komárom-Esztergom County
 2nd constituency of Komárom-Esztergom County
 3rd constituency of Komárom-Esztergom County

Nógrád
2 constituencies:

 1st constituency of Nógrád County
 2nd constituency of Nógrád County

Pest
12 constituencies:

 1st constituency of Pest County
 2nd constituency of Pest County
 3rd constituency of Pest County
 4th constituency of Pest County
 5th constituency of Pest County
 6th constituency of Pest County
 7th constituency of Pest County
 8th constituency of Pest County
 9th constituency of Pest County
 10th constituency of Pest County
 11th constituency of Pest County
 12th constituency of Pest County

Somogy
4 constituencies:

 1st constituency of Somogy County
 2nd constituency of Somogy County
 3rd constituency of Somogy County
 4th constituency of Somogy County

Szabolcs-Szatmár-Bereg
6 constituencies:

 1st constituency of Szabolcs-Szatmár-Bereg County
 2nd constituency of Szabolcs-Szatmár-Bereg County
 3rd constituency of Szabolcs-Szatmár-Bereg County
 4th constituency of Szabolcs-Szatmár-Bereg County
 5th constituency of Szabolcs-Szatmár-Bereg County
 6th constituency of Szabolcs-Szatmár-Bereg County

Tolna
3 constituencies:

 1st constituency of Tolna County
 2nd constituency of Tolna County
 3rd constituency of Tolna County

Vas
3 constituencies:

 1st constituency of Vas County
 2nd constituency of Vas County
 3rd constituency of Vas County

Veszprém
4 constituencies:

 1st constituency of Veszprém County
 2nd constituency of Veszprém County
 3rd constituency of Veszprém County
 4th constituency of Veszprém County

Zala
3 constituencies:

 1st constituency of Zala County
 2nd constituency of Zala County
 3rd constituency of Zala County

References

 
 
Hungary, National Assembly
Constituencies